The name Welpring has been used to name six tropical cyclones in the Philippine Area of Responsibility by the PAGASA in the Western Pacific Ocean.
 Typhoon Kathy (1964) (T6414, 14W, Welpring) – the largest and longest-lived typhoon in 1964
 Typhoon Louise (1976) (T7622, 26W, Welpring) – an intense typhoon that minor impacts to the Philippines and Japan.
 Typhoon Wynne (1980) (T8018, 24W, Welpring) – rapidly intensified to become the strongest storm of that season.
 Typhoon Bill (1984)  (T8426 30W, Welpring) – looped twice during its lifetime.
 Tropical Storm Tess (1988) (T8828, 50W, Welpring) – developed over the Philippines and struck southern Vietnam.
 Typhoon Soulik (2000) (T0022, 50W, Welpring) – lasted until early January 2001.
After the 2000 season, the PAGASA revised their naming lists and the name Welpring was excluded.

Set index articles on storms
Pacific typhoon set index articles